Calcipostia is a monotypic genus of fungi belonging to the family Fomitopsidaceae. The only species is Calcipostia guttulata.

The species scientific name is Calcipostia guttulata (Peck) B.K.Cui, L.L.Shen & Y.C.Dai, 2018.

Synonym:
 Postia guttulata (Peck) Jülich, 1982

References

Fomitopsidaceae
Polyporales genera
Monotypic Basidiomycota genera